Gichk (Baluchi and ) is a Sub/Tehsil in Panjgur District of Balochistan, Pakistan.

See also 
 Gichki

Panjgur District